Kneecap are a Belfast, Northern Ireland-based hip hop trio with the stage-names Mo Chara, Móglaí Bap and DJ Próvaí. They sing in Irish and often reference their support for republicanism. They first began releasing music in 2017 with their single "C.E.A.R.T.A." (Irish for "RIGHTS" as in human rights). They released their first album 3CAG in 2018, and continued to release various singles such as "Get Your Brits Out".

History 
The group began when Móglaí Bap was out spray-painting with a friend the day before the Irish Language Act march in Belfast. He had written "Cearta" on a bus stop when the police arrived and arrested his friend while Móglaí escaped. The friend refused to speak English, and ended up spending a night in the cells awaiting a translator. This was the inspiration for their song "C.E.A.R.T.A.", which they intended to release "just for the craic. No plans for after," Mo Chara said they wanted to "stick the feelers out and see how it would go down. Luckily people enjoyed it, so we're still at it."

In late 2017 their song "C.E.A.R.T.A." was banned from the Irish language radio RTÉ Raidió na Gaeltachta (RnaG) for "drug references and cursing". Fans started a petition which garnered 700 signatures to put the song back on air. Kneecap defended the song as "a caricature of life in west Belfast" and "a satirical take on life for young people, particularly in west Belfast".

In February 2019 they received condemnation from South Belfast Democratic Unionist Party MLA Christopher Stalford after videos of the trio were posted online, showing them chanting 'Brits Out' at a concert performed in the Empire Music Hall in Belfast. The concert took place the day after Prince William and Kate Middleton visited the venue.

In 2021 Kneecap released their single "MAM" as a tribute to their mothers, the song was acknowledged as a shift away from their usual style saying that they wanted to do something more "real". Mo Chara stated in an interview that they wanted to show that "we can “roundhouse” you off the stage but we can also give you a hug afterwards. We wanted to do something a bit sentimental, we don’t wanna just box ourselves in with masculinity all the time." The trio also revealed on Instagram that Móglaí Bap's mother had died of suicide before it could be released and that all proceeds from the song would be going to the Samaritans.

In 2020 they publicly supported a free Palestine by flying Palestinian flags at concerts and pledging to boycott Israel. They also have close links with a volunteer gym in the Aida Refugee Camp in Palestine, having helped raise funds for it and promoted it on their Instagram, and in 2022 Irish writer Manchán Magan released a cover of Kneecaps song C.E.A.R.T.A to raise money for the gym.

References 

Musical groups from Belfast
Musical groups established in 2017
Irish rappers
2017 establishments in Northern Ireland